Fifty Pills (also known as 50 Pills) is the debut comedy film of director Theo Avgerinos, which premiered at the 2006 Tribeca Film Festival.

Plot
After being blamed for a party which he didn't throw or have any knowledge of, that resulted in many damages, young Darren (Lou Taylor Pucci) loses his scholarship. Being from a lower-middle-class family he will not have enough money to pay for college next semester without his scholarship. His roommate, Coleman (John Hensley), who actually threw the party, sympathizes with Darren and gives him a stash of fifty ecstasy pills. If he sells the pills he would have enough money to stay in school.

Darren sells to many weirdos, including a dominatrix who wants the pills so her "pets" can be numb when she has sex with them. When he visits his girlfriend, her roommate sets Darren up with a connection. The brother of this roommate, a seemingly mentally-challenged and over-zealous white-collar employee named Ralphie (Eddie Kaye Thomas), is obsessed with Diff'rent Strokes. He makes Darren watch four hours of the show, but Darren leaves. Upon leaving he is harassed by a drug dealer known as The Seoul Man (Ron Yuan), who almost kills him. Once again his luck turns sour when his girlfriend finds out that he is selling drugs and breaks off with him.

Coleman owes money to a drug dealer, so a group of three armed thugs are sent to extract the money from him at his dorm. Not having the money, he says he will call Darren and they can take whatever pills he has left as collateral. Darren comes back to the dorm, and gives the pills to the thugs, who leave. The next day, Darren feels defeated, but discovers that Coleman paid his tuition in full and is leaving the college. Reinvigorated, Darren begins dating Gracie and the movie ends with the two sitting on a bench with Darren taking a picture on his phone, saying that Gracie is about to make his parents very happy.

Cast
 Lou Taylor Pucci as Darren
 Kristen Bell as Gracie
 John Hensley as Coleman
 Nora Zehetner as Michelle
 Diora Baird as Tiffany
 Michael Peña as Eduardo
 Jane Lynch as Doreen
 Monica Keena as Petunia
 Eddie Kaye Thomas as Ralphie
 John Kapelos as Harold
 Donnell Rawlings as C-Low
 Rachel Boston as Lindsay
 John Marshall Jones as Housing manager
 Chris J. Johnson as Paul
 Ron Yuan as The Seoul Man
 Michael Masini as Halo

Release and reception
Fifty Pills premiered at the 2006 Tribeca Film Festival on April 26, 2006.

References

External links
 
 
 
 

2006 films
2000s crime comedy-drama films
American crime comedy-drama films
American independent films
2006 directorial debut films
2006 comedy films
2006 drama films
2006 independent films
2000s English-language films
2000s American films